California's 54th State Assembly district is one of 80 California State Assembly districts. It is currently represented by Isaac Bryan of Los Angeles.

District profile 
The district encompasses parts of the Westside and South Los Angeles, reaching almost to the Pacific Ocean. The district is ethnically diverse and heavily urban.

Los Angeles County – 4.8%
 Culver City
 Inglewood – 0.3%
 Ladera Heights
 Los Angeles – 10.8%
 Baldwin Hills
 Century City
 Crenshaw
 Leimert Park
 Mar Vista – partial
 Mid-City
 West Los Angeles
 Westwood
 View Park-Windsor Hills

Election results from statewide races

List of Assembly Members 
Due to redistricting, the 54th district has been moved around different parts of the state. The current iteration resulted from the 2011 redistricting by the California Citizens Redistricting Commission.

Election results 1992 - present

2021 (special)

2020

2018

2018 (special)

2016

2014

2013 (special)

2012

2010

2008

2006

2004

2002

2000

1998

1996

1994

1992

See also 
 California State Assembly
 California State Assembly districts
 Districts in California

References

External links 
 District map from the California Citizens Redistricting Commission
 Grayson Pangilinan for California State Assembly

54
Government of Los Angeles County, California
Government of Los Angeles
Baldwin Hills (mountain range)
Baldwin Hills, Los Angeles
Century City, Los Angeles
Crenshaw, Los Angeles
Culver City, California
Mar Vista, Los Angeles
Mid-City, Los Angeles
West Los Angeles
Rancho Park, Los Angeles
South Los Angeles
Westside (Los Angeles County)
Westwood, Los Angeles